Helicella stiparum is a species of air-breathing land snails, terrestrial pulmonate gastropod mollusks in the family Geomitridae, the hairy snails and their allies.

Distribution

This species is endemic to Spain.

References

  Rossmässler, E. A. (1854-1858). Iconographie der Land- & Süßwasser-Mollusken Europa's, mit vorzüglicher Berücksichtigung kritischer und noch nicht abgebildeter Arten.
 Bank, R. A.; Neubert, E. (2017). Checklist of the land and freshwater Gastropoda of Europe. Last update: July 16th, 2017

Endemic molluscs of the Iberian Peninsula
Helicella
Endemic fauna of Spain
Gastropods described in 1854